This Is Hardcore is the sixth album by English band Pulp. Released in March 1998, it came three years after their breakthrough album, Different Class, and was eagerly anticipated.

Background and release
Friction grew in the band in the years following the massive success of Different Class, "culminating in the notable departure of guitarist and violinist Russell Senior; Cocker left for New York alone to decompress and write in isolation from the rest of the band."

As with the band's previous album,This is Hardcore reached No. 1 in the UK Albums Chart, but with far fewer sales,  and was well received critically, earning Pulp a third successive nomination for the 1998 Mercury Prize.

The cover photo was art directed by Peter Saville and the American painter John Currin who is known for his figurative paintings of exaggerated female forms. The model photographed is Ksenia Sobchak and the images were further digitally manipulated by Howard Wakefield, who also designed the album. Currin was also the art director for the "Help the Aged" video, based on his painting "The Never Ending Story". Advertising posters showing the album's cover that appeared on the London Underground system were defaced by graffiti artists with slogans like "This Offends Women" and "This is Sexist" or "This is Demeaning".

The music video for the title track was directed by Doug Nichol and was listed as the No. 47 best video of all time by NME. A bonus live CD entitled "This Is Glastonbury" was added to the album later in 1998. A deluxe edition of This Is Hardcore was released on 11 September 2006. It contained a second disc of B-sides, demos and rarities.

Commercial performance
The album had first-week sales of just over 50,000, 62% fewer than Different Class first-week sales of 133,000. The album was certified gold by the BPI April 1998 for sales of 100,000. As of 2008, sales in the United States have exceeded 86,000 copies, according to Nielsen SoundScan.

Reception and legacy

Nick Hornby, writing in Spin, proclaimed that on the album "England's unofficial poet laureate Jarvis Cocker perfects his poetry of the prosaic". Rolling Stone noted that This is Hardcore was "less bright and bouncy" than its era-defining predecessor, but praised it as being "even more daring and fully realized", noting that "it plays like a movie, a series of scenes from a life", and declared that it "is arguably the first pop album devoted entirely to the subject of the long, slow fade", which it heralded as "a bold move because it breaks one of rock's oldest songwriting taboos". The review concluded, "In midlife oblivion, Pulp have found a strange kind of liberation. Desperation never sounded quite so entertaining." Other reviews in the States adopted a similar tone, with the Chicago Tribune, Los Angeles Times, and the Pittsburgh Post-Gazette all awarding three and a half stars out of four. The Tribune hailed it as "a smashing album about midlife crisis" and found that "[the] music is sumptuous lounge-lizard rock augmented by strings and noisy disruptions - a clever, catchy '90s take on the Bowie/Mott/Roxy glam rock of the '70s."

In a retrospective assessment of the album's impact, Matthew Horton wrote in NME that "in its sense of surrender, regret and flashes of panic, it captured the time to a tee." In an article entitled, "How Pulp's This Is Hardcore Brought Britpop To A Halt", Horton maintained that it was "a sloughing-off of fame’s skin, a rejection of the Britpop monster". He concluded, "It's an end, a hard-wrought epitaph to a band's jaunt in the limelight and a suitable jump-off point for what had been a rare old few years – for us, at least." Another review found the song "A Little Soul" to be "Cocker's most disconsolately beautiful", drawing "from the musical blueprint of Smokey Robinson's 'Tracks of My Tears.'"

This is Hardcore was included in the book 1001 Albums You Must Hear Before You Die. In 2013, NME ranked it at number 166 in its list of the 500 Greatest Albums of All Time. In 2014, US LGBT magazine Metro Weekly placed the album at number 46 in its list of the "50 Best Alternative Albums of the '90s". In 2017, Pitchfork ranked it seventh in "The 50 Best Britpop Albums".

Track listing

Personnel

Pulp
Jarvis Cocker
Nick Banks
Candida Doyle
Steve Mackey
Mark Webber

Production
Chris Thomas – production
Pete Lewis – engineering
Lorraine Francis – assistant engineering
Jay Reynolds – assistant engineering
Olle Romo – programming
Matthew Vaughan – programming
Magnus Fiennes – programming
Mark Haley – programming
Anne Dudley – string arrangement 
Pulp – string arrangement 
Nicholas Dodd – orchestration 

Additional musicians
Anne Dudley – piano 
Chris Thomas – piano 
Neneh Cherry – featured vocals 
Mandy Bell – backing vocals 
Carol Kenyon – backing vocals 
Jackie Rawe – backing vocals 

Artwork
John Currin – direction
Peter Saville – direction
Horst Diekgerdes – photography
Howard Wakefield – design
Paul Hetherington – design

Charts and certifications

Weekly charts

Year-end charts

Certifications

References

External links

This Is Hardcore at YouTube (streamed copy where licensed)
 

Pulp (band) albums
1998 albums
Albums produced by Chris Thomas (record producer)
Obscenity controversies in music
Island Records albums
Albums recorded at Olympic Sound Studios
Glam rock albums by English artists